Kanao may refer to:

People 
 Kanao Araki, Japanese manga artist.
 Kanao Inouye (1916-1947), Japanese born Canadian criminal.
 Tetsuo Kanao (born 1950), Japanese actor.

Other 
 Kanao Tsuyuri, a character in the Demon Slayer manga.

See also